Kairembikhok is a village in Thoubal District in Manipur, India.

About Kairembikhok
Kairembikhok is a village located in Thoubal district in the Indian state of Manipur. 

The village comes under Wangbal panchayat. The District headquarters of the village is Thoubal which is 9 km away.

Geography
The nearest town is Wangjing, 3 km away.

Economy
The majority of the population practice agriculture and carpentry. Kairembikhok is known for the production of furniture items.

Connectivity
Four inter-village roads connect Kairembikhok with other part of the district:
 Wangjing Kairembikhok road 
 Wangbal Kairembikhok road
 Salungpham Kairembikhok road
 Heirok Kairembikhok road

Politics
Wangjing Tentha assembly constituency (Assembly Constituency No. 34) is part of Outer Manipur (Lok Sabha constituency).

References

Thoubal
Villages in Thoubal district